The Flannan Isles or alternatively, the Seven Hunters are a small island group in the Outer Hebrides of Scotland, approximately  west of the Isle of Lewis. They may take their name from Saint Flannan, the 7th century Irish preacher and abbot.

The islands have been devoid of permanent residents since the automation of Flannan Isles Lighthouse in 1971.

Geography
 
The geology consists of a dark breccia of gabbros and dolerites intruding Archaean gneiss. In prehistoric times, the area was covered by ice sheets that spread from Scotland out into the Atlantic Ocean. After the last retreat of the ice circa 20,000 years BP, sea levels were as much as  lower than at present and it is likely that the existing islands were part of a much larger land mass, although still separated from the Outer Hebrides by many miles of open water. Steadily rising sea levels thereafter would have reduced the land remaining above sea level to its present extent.

There are two possible landing places for yachts visiting  to the east and west, although this may be hazardous given the regular heavy swells.

History

As the name implies, Eilean Taighe hosts a ruined stone shelter. Eilean Mòr is home to the lighthouse and a ruined chapel dedicated to Saint Flannán, which the lighthouse keepers referred to as the "dog kennel" because of its small size. These ruined bothies were described collectively by the Ancient Monuments Commission as The Bothies of the Clan McPhail, or Bothain Chlann ‘ic Phaill.

It is not entirely clear to which St Flannan the chapel pays honours. It is likely that the honoree was either the 7th-century Abbot of Killaloe, County Clare, Ireland, or alternatively, the half brother of the eighth century St Ronan, who gave his name to the nearby island of North Rona. There was also a certain Flann, son of an Abbot of Iona, called Maol-duine, who died in 890 and may also have lent his name to these isolated isles.

The archipelago is also known as The Seven Hunters. During the Middle Ages, they also may have been called the Seven Haley (Holy) Isles. Martin Martin (1703) lists a number of unusual customs associated with regular pilgrimages to Eilean Mòr, such as removing one's hat and making a sunwise turn when reaching the plateau.

Wildlife

The isles provide nesting for a population of seabirds, including Atlantic puffins, northern fulmars, European storm-petrels, Leach's petrels, common shag, and black-legged kittiwakes. There is a gannetry on Roaireim. From the late Middle Ages on, Lewismen regularly raided these nests for eggs, birds, and feathers. There is a population of rabbits, brought to the islands by the lighthouse keepers, and crofters from Bernera graze sheep on the most fertile islands. Minke and pilot whales, as well as Risso's and other species of dolphin, are commonly observed in the vicinity.

The islands became a Site of Special Scientific Interest in December 1983.

Lighthouse crew disappearance

In December 1900, all three lighthouse keepers vanished in mysterious circumstances. An official inquiry concluded that the three men had likely been swept away and lost at sea in rough weather while attending some equipment near the cliff edge.

In fiction
The Flannan Isles are the main setting in Robert W. Sneddons's short story On the Isle of Blue Men which was first published in Ghost Stories magazine in April 1927. The Scottish-American author's "atmospheric, Lovecraftian thriller" was reissued by Charles G. Waugh with an alternate ending based on an older story by Sneddon in the Lighthouse Horrors anthology in 1993. Neil Gunn's epic novel The Silver Darlings published in 1941 describes a visit to the islands. Eilean Mòr in particular also features prominently as the location of a murder central to the plot of Coffin Road, a 2016 novel by Peter May.

The Vanishing, a 2019 film starring Gerard Butler and Peter Mullan, is set on the isles and inspired by the infamous disappearances.

See also

List of islands of Scotland

References
McCloskey, Keith. (1 July 2014) "The Lighthouse: The Mystery of the Eilean Mor Lighthouse Keepers", Stroud, the History Press.
Elliott, Angela J (1 April 2005)"Some Strange Scent of Death", Dunbeath, Whittles Publishing. 
Bathhurst, Bella. (2000) The Lighthouse Stevensons. London. Flamingo. 

Harvie-Brown, J. A. & Buckley, T. E. (1889), A Vertebrate Fauna of the Outer Hebrides. Edinburgh. David Douglas.
Martin, Martin (1703) A Description of the Western Isles of Scotland including A Voyage to St. Kilda Retrieved 8 October 2008.
Murray, W.H. (1973) The Islands of Western Scotland. London. Eyre Methuen. SBN 413303802
Munro, R.W. (1979) Scottish Lighthouses. Stornoway. Thule Press. 
Nicholson, Christopher. (1995) Rock Lighthouses of Britain: The End of an Era? Caithness. Whittles. 
Perrot, D. et al. (1995) The Outer Hebrides Handbook and Guide. Machynlleth. Kittiwake.

Notes

External links
Northern Lighthouse Board information about Flannan Isles lighthouse
Northern Lighthouse Board information about the disappearance of the keepers
The Vanishing Lighthousemen of Eilean Mór  Investigative paper based on primary sources

Sites of Special Scientific Interest in Western Isles North
Uninhabited islands of the Outer Hebrides
Archipelagoes of Scotland